Mike Brown (born September 9, 1981) is a Canadian former professional ice hockey goaltender.

Brown attended Ferris State University where he played four seasons (2001–2005) of NCAA hockey in the Central Collegiate Hockey Association (CCHA) with the Ferris State Bulldogs. In his freshman season he was named to the 2001–02 CCHA All-Rookie Team. The following season he was again recognized for his outstanding play when he was named to the 2002–03 CCHA All-Conference First Team, and was also selected to the 2002–03 NCAA (West) First All-American Team.

Brown went on to play the 2005–06 season in the ECHL with the Fresno Falcons and Columbia Inferno.

Awards and honours

References

External links

1981 births
Living people
Canadian ice hockey goaltenders
Columbia Inferno players
Ferris State Bulldogs men's ice hockey players
Fresno Falcons players
AHCA Division I men's ice hockey All-Americans